Women's suffrage refers to the right of a woman to vote in an election. This right was often not included in the original suffrage legislation of a state or country, resulting in both men and women campaigning to introduce legislation to enable women to vote. Actions included writing letters to newspapers and legislators, compiling petitions, holding marches and rallies and carrying out acts of violence. Women were on occasion arrested for these actions and held in jail, during which time some went on hunger strikes,  refusing to eat for the duration of their incarceration.

Monuments and memorials to women's suffrage have been constructed around the world in recognition of the bravery and strength of the women who campaigned for voting rights, and the achievement of having the legislation passed.

Australia

Canada

New Zealand

United Kingdom

United States

See also
 Susan B. Anthony Birthplace Museum, Adams, Massachusetts
 Susan B. Anthony Childhood House, Battenville, New York
 Susan B. Anthony House, Rochester, New York
 Elizabeth Cady Stanton House, Seneca Falls, New York
 Elizabeth Cady Stanton House, Tenafly, New Jersey
 Paulsdale, Mount Laurel Township, New Jersey, birthplace and childhood home of Alice Paul
 Women's Rights National Historical Park, Seneca County, New York
M'Clintock House, site of the writing of the 1848 Declaration of Sentiments
Wesleyan Methodist Church, site of the 1848 Seneca Falls Convention
 Centenary of Women's Suffrage mural, Lake Grace, Australia

References

Bibliography
 

Women's suffrage
01